GDP of Nepalese provinces in 2079 B.S. (2023). The total GDP of the country is US$ 45.9 billion

See also 

 List of Nepalese provinces by Population
 List of Nepalese provinces by HDI
 Administrative divisions of Nepal

References

Nepal
G
Economy of Nepal